Pierre Courtade (3 January 1915 – 14 May 1963) was a French writer and journalist.

Biography 
Pierre Courtade was born in to a modest family of a post office employee.

A student of Jean Guéhenno, Courtade began his career as a journalist at Le Progrès de Lyon. During this period he met writers such as Louis Aragon, Roger Vailland and René Tavernier who greatly influenced him.

He joined the French Communist Party (PCF) during the Second World War while participating in the Resistance. In 1944, he was arrested at the Au Vieux Paris café in the company of fellow Communist resistance members. After the Liberation, he joined the editorial staff of the weekly L'Action, close to the Communist Party.

In 1946, Maurice Thorez asked him to hold the international section of L'Humanité which directed it until his death. In April 1948, he was in Genoa with Roger Vailland and Claude Roy to cover the major strikes taking place there. He also contributed to other Communist Party publications, including Les Cahiers du communisme, Démocratie nouvelle, L'Humanité-Dimanche. He was sent as a permanent correspondent for L'Humanité in Moscow.

Courtade decided to leave Moscow at the end of April 1963; his successor, Jean Kanapa, had already been appointed. Fifteen days after his return to Paris, he was hospitalized and died of cardiac complications.

Works

Novels and stories 

 Les Circonstances, recueil de nouvelles, Les Éditeurs français réunis (EFR), 1946 et 1954 (illustrated by Édouard Pignon); Le Temps des Cerises, 1991
 Elseneur, roman, La Bibliothèque française, 1949
 Jimmy, EFR, 1951 Paris in-12 Broché, 358 pages
 La Rivière noire, EFR, 1953
 Les Animaux supérieurs, recueil de nouvelles, Éditions Julliard, 1956
 La Place rouge, roman, Éditions Julliard, 1961; coll. «10/18», 1970; EFR, 1978; Temps Actuels, 1982
 Le Jeu de paume, roman, Le Temps des Cerises, 1997

Non-fiction 

 Essai sur l'antisoviétisme, Éditions Raisons d'être, 1946
 Images de la Russie, Éditions du Chêne, 1947
 L'Albanie : notes de voyage et documents, Éditions Sociales, 1950
 Dessins de Louis Mitelberg, présenté par Pierre Courtade, Éditeur Le Cercle d'Art, 1953
 Khrouchtchev inédit, Éditions Sociales, 1960
 Roger Vailland et le héros de roman, introduction de Pierre Courtade, Legs Roger Vailland

References

1915 births
1963 deaths
20th-century French writers
20th-century French journalists
Communist members of the French Resistance
Foreign correspondents
20th-century French short story writers
French Communist Party politicians
French newspaper editors